Joaquin Ridge is a ridge in the Diablo Range in Fresno County, California. The ridge is named for Joaquin Murietta (1830-1853), a California Gold Rush bandit, leader of the Five Joaquins Gang, who used this region as a rendezvous and camp that overlooked the gangs base at the Rancho de Cantua. Joaquin Ridge is bound on the northeast by the Ragged Valley and the Big Blue Hills and on the southwest by Portuguese Canyon.

The most distinguishing feature of Joaquin Ridge is Joaquin Rocks, originally known as "Las Tres Piedras" (The Three Rocks). These three pillars of rock on the ridge are clearly visible on the ridge for many miles from many directions in the San Joaquin Valley and from their summits have a view of much of the valley.

References 

Ridges of California
Landforms of Fresno County, California
Diablo Range